Susan Alice Buffett (born July 30, 1953) is an American philanthropist who is the daughter of Warren Buffett and Susan Thompson Buffett. Her charitable work has focused largely on the Sherwood Foundation, formerly known as the Susan A. Buffett Foundation, an organization in Omaha that provides grants in public education, human services and social justice in the interest of promoting the welfare of children from lower-income families. She is also on the boards of the Susan Thompson Buffett Foundation, The Buffett Early Childhood Institute, and Girls, Inc. According to a 2010 interview with her brother Howard Graham Buffett, Buffett's philanthropic focus has consistently remained on children, education and family issues, but she has also committed to other causes, including Debt, AIDS, Trade, Africa, a non-governmental organization dedicated to various improvements in Africa.

Biography
Born in Omaha in 1953, Buffett, commonly called Susie, is the eldest child of Warren Buffett.

She attended the University of Nebraska–Lincoln, where she majored in home economics, and studied at the University of California, Irvine, where she majored in social ecology.

Her parents separated in the late 1970s (though they remained married until her mother's death in 2004). Despite his wealth, Warren Buffett encouraged his children to be financially independent; Susan Buffett recalled in 2006 that in spite of her father's generosity, he once refused her a personal loan of $41,000 to expand her kitchen. Her foundation, however, was funded primarily by $1 billion in shares from her father, Warren Buffett.

In 1983, Buffett wed Allen Greenberg, a lawyer for Public Citizen, whom she had met in Washington. The couple divorced in 1995.

In 1987, Greenberg became the first director of the Buffett Foundation, a title he retained after the couple's divorce.

References

1953 births
Living people
American philanthropists
Susan Alice Buffett
People from Omaha, Nebraska